Ann B. Ross is an America author noted for her series of New York Times bestsellers set in her home state of North Carolina This comedic cozy mystery series features Miss Julia, whose name appears at the beginning of each title in the series. Ross also taught literature and humanities at the University of North Carolina at Asheville.

Early life 
Ross attended Blue Ridge Community College and Armstrong College before completing her B.A. in literature at the University of North Carolina at Asheville in 1984, while her children were also at university. She earned an MA and Ph.D. in Old English from the University of North Carolina at Chapel Hill (UNC) in 1991.

Career 
Ross began her publishing career in the early 1980s with two paperback murder mysteries: The Murder Cure published in 1978 and The Murder Stroke published in 1981. They "didn't do very well" and she gave up on writing. While a graduate student, she wrote The Pilgrimage, an adventure story about two North Carolina sisters who go west in the 19th–century as missionaries. Doris Betts, a novelist and creative writing professor at UNC, put Ross in touch with agent Rhoda Weyr, who read The Pilgrimage and sold it to MacMillan Press in 1988. However, sales were again limited. 

After 1991, Ross transitioned to a career as a university instructor at the University of North Carolina at Asheville, when Miss Julia just "came into her head." Ross said, “For the first time in my life, I was no one’s daughter, niece, wife, or mother. I was just Ann, and my identity came from my classroom performance alone. ...It was absolutely liberating.” The fictional Miss Julia (aka Mrs. Wesley Lloyd Springer), is "a refined Southern woman" whose life is disrupted by the secrets of her deceased husband. Ross writes from Miss Julia's perspective.

Despite the prediction of an editor at William Morrow "that her audience would be limited to women over forty in the Southeastern United States", the first book in the series, Miss Julia Speaks Her Mind, sold well and went through six printings its first year. The Independent Booksellers Association ranked number nine on its list of recommended books for the year. It also was named to the Barnes & Noble Discover Great New Writers list." Reader's Digest Condensed Books issued the book in twelve different languages."

The novels' plots often depend on points of North Carolina state law to do, for example, with inheritance, mental competence, and a mother's fitness to care for her child (as in Miss Julia Speaks Her Mind and Miss Julia Takes Over). One of the common themes in the series is hypocrisy among the clergy. 

The Miss Julia series is popular among book clubs in the United States and is also successful in Germany, Japan, and Poland. Ross is particularly proud of a fan letter from Dolly Parton. In 2017 Miss Julia Inherits a Mess was nominated for a Southern Book Prize by the Southern Independent Booksellers Association.

When Ross wrote Miss Julia Goes Rogue featuring the same character as a brutal and sexy vampire, "Ross’ publisher, unwilling to upset the original Miss Julia brand, refused to green-light the project." Journalists at a newspaper in western North Carolina included Ross along with Woody Harrelson, Christo and Jeanne-Claude, and Gladys Knight in a spoof of crowd-sourced funding campaigns to get this novel published

In 2021, Ross ended the 22-volume series with Miss Julia Happily Ever After.“ Ross said, "As I wrote Happily Ever After, a series of changes in my personal and professional lives were converging in such a way that I began to feel that somebody was trying to tell me something. Miss Julia and the ones she loves are in a good place right now, nothing that needs to be wrapped up is pending, most questions have been answered, no one is languishing in jail [and] everybody is home where they’re supposed to be, so it all felt like a good place to just let go.” 

Columbia Tri-Star Productions optioned Miss Julia Speaks Her Mind which is under consideration for either a film or television series by independent producers.

Personal life 
Ross married Dr. Marion Ross. The couple has two daughters and one son. Ross lives in Hendersonville, North Carolina, the basis for the town in the Miss Julia books. Until 1977, they lived in a historical house built in 1836 that inspired Miss Julia's house. 

In 2010 UNC-Asheville honored her as a Distinguished Alumna for her career as a novelist.

Publications

Novels 
The Murder Cure (Avon Books, 1978) 
The Murder Stroke (Nordon Publications, 1981) 
The Pilgrimage (Macmillan Publishing Company, 1987) 
Miss Julia Speaks Her Mind (William Morrow, 1999) 
Miss Julia Takes Over (Viking, 2001) 
Miss Julia Throws a Wedding (Viking, 2002) 
Miss Julia Hits the Road (Viking, 2003) 
Miss Julia Meets Her Match (Viking, 2004) 
Miss Julia's School of Beauty (Viking, 2005) 
Miss Julia Stands Her Ground (Viking, 2006) 
Miss Julia Strikes Back (Viking, 2007) 
Miss Julia Paints the Town (Viking, 2008) 
Miss Julia Delivers the Goods (Viking, 2009) 
Miss Julia Renews Her Vows (Viking, 2010) 
Miss Julia Rocks the Cradle (Viking, 2011) 
Miss Julia to the Rescue (Viking, 2012) 
Miss Julia Stirs Up Trouble (2013) 
Miss Julia's Marvelous Makeover (Viking, 2014) 
Etta Mae's Worst Bad–Luck Day (Viking, 2014) 
Miss Julia Lays Down the Law (Viking, 2015) 
Miss Julia Inherits a Mess (Viking, 2016) 
Miss Julia Weathers the Storm (Viking, 2017) 
Miss Julia Raises the Roof (Viking, 2018) 
Miss Julia Takes the Wheel (Viking, 2019) 
Miss Julia Knows a Thing or Two (Viking, 2020) 
Miss Julia Happily Ever After (Viking, 2021)

Novelette 

 Miss Julia's Gift (Viking, 2013)

References

Year of birth missing (living people)
Living people
University of North Carolina at Asheville alumni
University of North Carolina at Chapel Hill alumni
20th-century American novelists
21st-century American novelists
American women novelists
20th-century American women writers
21st-century American women writers
Writers of American Southern literature
University of North Carolina at Asheville faculty
People from Hendersonville, North Carolina
American mystery writers
Writers from North Carolina